Thomas Lamb House, also known as "My Home," is a historic home located at Kenton, Kent County, Delaware.  The house dates to about 1855, and is a two-story, three bay, side hall plan frame dwelling in the Greek Revival style. It has a long and low rear wing with a porch.  Both sections have gable roofs.  Also on the property are a contributing barn with stable, a frame milk house, and a privy.

It was listed on the National Register of Historic Places in 1983. The house was demolished between 1992 and 2002, and the milk house between 2002 and 2006.

References

Houses on the National Register of Historic Places in Delaware
Greek Revival houses in Delaware
Houses completed in 1855
Houses in Kent County, Delaware
Kenton, Delaware
National Register of Historic Places in Kent County, Delaware
Demolished buildings and structures in Delaware